Bal Krishna Karki ndc, psc, MA, is a Lieutenant general in the Nepal Army and incumbent Vice Chief of Army Staff (VCOAS). Prior to join this post, he previously served as Assistant Chief of Army Staff of Nepal army.

Career 
Karki was commissioned from Royal Military Academy, Sandhurst, United Kingdom as second Lieutenant on August 8, 1987. He served as Commandant of Army Command & Staff College, Shivapuri.

References 

Nepalese military personnel
Living people
Year of birth missing (living people)